Longgang is a county-level city of Zhejiang, China, under the administration of Wenzhou, located around  south of downtown Wenzhou.

The City was formed on the basis of five fishing villages and less than in 1983, following the seaport construction in 1982. In 1984, the No.1 Document of the State Council of China states that "farmers who can live self-sufficiently can be given hukou of city and town dwellers." Accordingly, the Town of Longgang decided to open up its hukou to such farmers who bought land to construct houses, or who did business in the Town. In the first month, more than 3,000 registered for moving to the Town. Since then, the population of the Town started booming and in 1989, the Town's population reached 40,000. With the population increase, Longgang's economy boomed , and has become a center of printing industry in China. China Business Network has described Longgang as "probably the largest town in China".

Ever since 1987, Longgang has begun appealing for cityhood. The related reforms have begun since 1996. In August 2019, approved by the Ministry of Civil Affairs, Longgang was proclaimed to be a county-level city by the provincial government of Zhejiang, which was the first among the economically developed towns in China.

Toponymy 
The winding Aojiang River was also called the Qinglong River by the locals of the south bank of the river, for the river resembles a green Chinese dragon (loong) in its lower reach. After the establishment of Cangnan County in 1981, the County Government decided to built a sea port on the south bank. The villages of Longjiang and Yanjiang was chosen as the site of the port. After the site choice was announced in February 1982, the people of Lingxi, the county seat, began protesting against the decision in fear of the relocation of the county seat and beat the CCP high officials from Wenzhou. Thus, the town near the port was not given a name due to political sensitiveness. The area was first called Yanjiang Port Area. Since in Chinese, Yanjiang Port Area can be also interpreted as a port upon the river, which leads to ambiguity, the area was renamed as Longjiang Port Area. In 1983, when the Port Area appealed for township, Chen Junqiu, the official in command of the port, took one character from Longjiang and another from Port Area and made the blend word of Longgang to refer to the area.

References

Cited books

Further reading

External links 

 龙港网

County-level cities in Zhejiang
Geography of Wenzhou